I Still Believe in You may refer to:

I Still Believe in You (album), by Vince Gill, 1992
"I Still Believe in You" (Vince Gill song), its title track
"I Still Believe in You" (Cliff Richard song), 1992
"I Still Believe in You" (The Desert Rose Band song), 1988